Baniyabhar is a village development committee in Bardiya District in Lumbini Province of south-western Nepal. At the time of the 2011 Nepal census it had a population of 17,682 people living in 3,561 individual households. There were 8,571 males and 9,111 females at the time of census.

References

Populated places in Bardiya District